The name Ammiel ( ‘Ammî’êl) may refer to several people in the Hebrew Bible. Etymologically, it means "people of God", and is used for the following individuals:
 Ammiel, son of Gemalli, one of the twelve spies sent by Moses to search the land of Canaan (Numbers 13:12). He was one of the ten who perished by the plague for their unfavourable report (Numbers 14:37).
 The father of Machir of Lo-debar, in whose house Mephibosheth the son of Jonathan resided (2 Samuel 9:4, 5; 17:27).
 The father of Bathsheba, the wife of Uriah, and afterwards of David (1 Chronicles 3:5). He is called Eliam in 2 Samuel 11:3.
 One of the sons of Obed-edom the Levite (1 Chronicles 26:5).

Notable examples
 Ammiel Alcalay (born 1956), American poet
 Ammiel Bushakevitz (born 1986), Israeli-South African pianist
 Ammiel Hirsch (born 1959), Reform Jewish rabbi
 Ammiel J. Willard (1822-1900), chief justice on the South Carolina Supreme Court

References

Book of Numbers people